Matthew Douglas Gray, OAM(born 20 December 1977) is an Australian Paralympic cyclist.  He was born in Perth. At the 1996 Atlanta Games, he won a silver medal in the Mixed Omnium LC1 event. He won two gold medals at the 2000 Sydney Games in the Mixed 1 km Time Trial LC1 and Mixed Olympic Sprint LC1–3 events, for which he received a Medal of the Order of Australia. He broke a world record in the former event.

References

Australian male cyclists
Paralympic cyclists of Australia
Cyclists at the 1996 Summer Paralympics
Cyclists at the 2000 Summer Paralympics
Medalists at the 1996 Summer Paralympics
Medalists at the 2000 Summer Paralympics
Paralympic gold medalists for Australia
Paralympic silver medalists for Australia
Recipients of the Medal of the Order of Australia
Cyclists from Perth, Western Australia
Sportsmen from Western Australia
1977 births
Living people
Paralympic medalists in cycling